An Minh is a rural district (huyện) of Kiên Giang province in the Mekong Delta region of Vietnam.

Divisions
The district is divided into the following communes:

An Minh, Đông Thạnh, Tân Thạnh, Thuận Hoà, Vân Khánh Đông, Vân Khánh Tây, Vân Khánh, Đông Hưng, Đông Hưng A, Đông Hưng B and Đông Hoà.

As of 2003 the district had a population of 112,215. The district covers an area of 711 km². The district capital lies at Thứ Mười Một.

References

Districts of Kiên Giang province